Echinopyrrhosia is a genus of parasitic flies in the family Tachinidae. There are about nine described species in Echinopyrrhosia.

Species
These nine species belong to the genus Echinopyrrhosia:
 Echinopyrrhosia alpina Townsend, 1914
 Echinopyrrhosia arrogans Reinhard, 1975
 Echinopyrrhosia atypica Townsend, 1914
 Echinopyrrhosia browni Curran, 1941
 Echinopyrrhosia melanica Townsend, 1914
 Echinopyrrhosia pellacis Reinhard, 1975
 Echinopyrrhosia pictipennis Curran, 1941
 Echinopyrrhosia trophocyon Aldrich, 1928
 Echinopyrrhosia varia (Walker, 1853)

References

Further reading

 
 
 
 

Tachinidae
Articles created by Qbugbot